The history of figure skating stretches back to prehistoric times. Primitive ice skates appear in the archaeological record from about 3000 BC. Edges were added by the Dutch in the 13th and 14th century. International figure skating competitions began appearing in the late 19th century; in 1891, the European Championships were inaugurated in Hamburg, Germany, and in 1896, the first World Championship were held in Saint Petersburg, Russian Empire. At the 1908 Summer Olympics in London, England, figure skating became the first winter sport to be included in the Olympics.

Archaeology and earliest historical documentation

The exact time and process by which humans first learned to ice skate is unknown. Primitive animal bone ice skates have been found in Scandinavia and Russia, some dating back to about 3000 BC.

The earliest clear, written mention of ice skating is found in a book written in the 12th century by William Fitzstephen, a monk in Canterbury. In the work, centered on Thomas Becket, he describes a scene taking place below the northern city walls of Canterbury during the winter:

...if the moors in Finsbury and Moorfield freeze over, children from London play. Some of the children have attached bones to their ankles, and carry well-worn sticks. They fly across the ice like birds, or well-fired arrows. Suddenly, two children will run at each other, sticks held high in the air. They then attack each other until one falls down. Often, the children injure their heads or break their arms or legs...

The sticks that Fitzstephen refers to were used for movement, as the primitive bone-made ice skates did not have sharp gliding edges like modern ice skates. Adding edges to ice skates was invented by the Dutch in the 13th or 14th century. These ice skates were made of steel, with sharpened edges on the bottom to aid movement. The construction of modern ice skates has remained largely the same. The only other major change in ice skate design came soon after. Around the same time period as steel edges were added to ice skates, another Dutchman, a table maker's apprentice, experimented with the height to width ratio of the metal blade of the ice skates, producing a design that remains almost unaltered to this day. The user of the skates no longer needed to use sticks for propulsion, and movement on skates was now freer and more stable.

The first depiction of ice skating in a work of art was made in the 15th century. The picture, of Saint Lidwina, patron saint of ice skaters, falling on the ice was the first work of art to feature ice skating as a main theme. Another important aspect of the painting is a man seen in the background, who is skating on one leg. This means that the ice skates the man was wearing must have sharp edges similar to those found on modern ice skates.

Social status of ice skating
In the Netherlands, ice skating was considered proper for all classes of people to participate in, as shown in many pictures by the Old Masters. Skating was used as a means of transportation because the waterways which connected Dutch towns sometimes froze for months on end, hampering the economy.

In other regions, participation in ice skating was limited to only members of the upper classes. Emperor Rudolf II of the Holy Roman Empire enjoyed ice skating so much he had a large ice carnival constructed in his court in 1610 in order to popularize the sport. King Louis XVI of France brought ice skating to Paris during his reign. Madame de Pompadour, Napoleon I, Napoleon III, and the House of Stuart were, among others, royal and upper class fans of ice skating.

18th and 19th centuries

The next step in the development of ice skating came in 1742, when the first ice skating association was formed, the Edinburgh Skating Club. The first instructional book concerning ice skating was published in London in 1772. The book, written by a British artillery lieutenant, Robert Jones, describes basic figure skating forms such as circles and figure eights. The book was written solely for men, as women did not normally ice skate in the late 18th century. It was with the publication of this manual that ice skating split into its two main disciplines, speed skating and figure skating.

In the winter of 1858–59, a skating pond opened in New York's Central Park, re-igniting interest in the activity. Sex segregation at ponds disappeared early on and skating became "one of the only activities that single men and women could do together unchaperoned." Additional skating ponds opened in Brooklyn, Hoboken, Jersey City, and Staten Island as the activity grew in popularity. The Skating Club of New York was founded in 1863. Jackson Haines, an American, was the first skater to incorporate ballet and dance movements into his skating, as opposed to focusing on tracing patterns on the ice. He also invented the sit spin and developed a shorter, curved blade for figure skating that allowed for easier turns. Haines was also the first to wear blades that were permanently attached to the boot. He won the first Championships of America held in Troy, New York in 1864.

For a time, the stiff and rigid British figure skating forms dominated in America, trumping Haines's more artistic way of skating. Haines instead attempted to spread his innovations in ice skating style in Europe, gaining success in such countries as Sweden and Austria. His style was still opposed by both his American colleagues as well as skaters from Victorian England, who continued to advocate a stiffer and more restrained style of skating. Haines continued to add new dance elements to his routines, and astounded a crowd in Vienna in the winter of 1868. Many in the audience expressed wonder at how a normal man could move over the ice in such a manner. Haines's performance led to the establishment of the Vienna School, which continued to develop Haines's artistic style. Although Haines himself died at the age of 35 in 1875 from the effects of tuberculosis, his influence lived on. His students at the Vienna School established the International Skating Union in 1892, the first international ice skating organization, and one of the oldest sports associations still in existence. It was founded in Scheveningen, in the Netherlands, but is now based in Lausanne, Switzerland. The Union created the first codified set of figure skating rules.

Figure skating historian Nigel Brown said this about the development of figure skating in the late 1800s: "To the Viennese, skating meant primarily something to see, to the English it was something to do". For writer Ellyn Kestnbaum, not only does this distinction applies to the difference between spectator and participatory sports, it "also points to skating's perennlal status as both sport and performing art".

The first international figure skating competition was held in Vienna in 1882; according to Kestnbaum, it established the precedence for future competitions.   Skaters from Vienna came in first and second place, with Leopold Frey, who was a student of Haines', coming in second place. Axel Paulsen from Norway came in third place. Competitors were judged on 23 compulsory figures, a four-minute free skating program, and special figures.

In 1891, the first European Figure Skating Championships were held in Hamburg, Germany. 1896 saw the introduction of the World Figure Skating Championships in Saint Petersburg, Russian Empire.

Early 20th century

In the beginning of the 20th century, figure skating was lent a more athletic character through the developments of Ulrich Salchow, a Swede. Salchow was considered the greatest figure skater of his day by far, winning the world championships ten times. The crowning achievement of his career, however, was his development of ice skates with slightly serrated blades, giving enough traction on the ice to launch long jumps. The salchow jump, still used prominently in figure skating routines today, is named for him, and was considered Salchow's greatest contribution to figure skating.

Figure skating's Olympic debut came at the 1908 Summer Olympics—it was the first winter sport introduced to the Olympics. The competition included men's singles, ladies' singles, pairs, and special figures.

The largest public ice rink in the world, the Sportpalast in Berlin, opened in the 1910s. The rink had an area of 2,400 m2 (25,800 ft2), with dimensions of 60 m by 40 m (197 ft by 131 ft). The new rink increased both the public interest in figure skating as well as the number of people who practiced the sport. Many new figure skaters came from Germany, among them Werner Rittberger and Charlotta Oelschägel. Rittberger invented another jump, at first named eponymously, but eventually changed to the name it is known by today, the loop jump. Oelschlägel won a championship in the United States at the age of 17, and had a professional career spanning ten years.

No major international championships were held from 1915 to 1921 due to World War I and the post-war recovery. In 1922, the World and European Championships were renewed and in 1924 figure skating was part of the first Winter Olympics, held in Chamonix, France. Norway's Sonja Henie and Austria's Karl Schäfer dominated the sport during the inter-war period. Henie, a ten-time world champion, brought a new style to figure skating in both athletic practice and dress. Previously, female figure skaters had skated in bulky clothing and long skirts. Henie broke with tradition by wearing a short knee-length skirt during her routines. In addition, her fluid and unlabored movements and overall elegance were considered to be a major advancement for figure skating. In the period from 1929 to 1936, Schäfer won the European title eight times and the World title seven times.

Although the Russian Empire hosted the first World Championships and Nikolai Panin won gold in special figures at the 1908 Olympics, its successor state, the Soviet Union, was largely absent from international figure skating competitions for several decades.

Post-World War II to present day
Not held from 1940 due to World War II, the European and World Championships returned in 1946. The construction of new ice rinks, built solely for ice skating, allowed much more intensive training and improved performance on the ice. This led to other changes in the sport, such as a heavier emphasis on the free skate, a move which disenchanted some spectators.

In 1952, ice dancing was added to the World Championships. It appeared at the 1968 Winter Olympics as a demonstration sport and was added as a medal sport at the 1976 Olympics.

Because of the years of war, Europe fell behind North America in terms of figure skating dominance. Many of the new top competitors came from the United States and Canada, bringing with them a style that emphasized speed, endurance, and dynamic movements. They included Americans Richard Button (who was the first skater to complete both the double Axel jump and a loop jump with three rotations), Hayes Alan Jenkins, David Jenkins, Tenley Albright, and Carol Heiss; and Canadians Barbara Ann Scott and Donald Jackson. In 1961, the crash of Sabena Flight 548 claimed the lives of the entire United States figure skating team and their coaches. The event sharply reduced American strength in the sport for a period but by the late 1960s the country began a resurgence led by Peggy Fleming.

The Soviet Union began appearing on the international scene in the late 1950s. Winning gold at the 1964 Winter Olympics, Ludmila Belousova / Oleg Protopopov began a forty-year Soviet/Russian gold medal streak in pair skating—the longest in Olympic sports history, running from 1964 to 2006.

1973 was the last year in which solid gold medals were awarded in figure skating. Once worth 60% of the score in single skating, compulsory figures steadily decreased in value to 20% and were eliminated from international competition after the 1989–90 season.

Skaters were able to achieve greater speed with improvements in blade sharpening and water purification (affecting ice quality). According to S. Schonmetzler, average distances traveled during a singles' long program were 1100 metres for men and 970 metres for women in 1980, growing to 1320 m and 1150 m respectively by the 1986 World Championships. In 1992, women performed an element on average every 10.4 seconds and men every 12.8 seconds.

Figure skaters were once subject to restrictive amateur status rules. In May 1990, the International Skating Union voted to allow skaters who were intending to skate professionally to return to ISU competition if they obtained their national association's permission. In June 1992, skaters who had already lost their eligibility were given an opportunity to apply for reinstatement in order to compete at the 1994 Winter Olympics. The Champions Series was introduced in 1995 and retitled the Grand Prix series in 1998. The Four Continents Figure Skating Championships were held for the first time in 1999 in Halifax, Nova Scotia, Canada.

Following the 2002 Winter Olympics, and the 2002 Winter Olympics figure skating scandal, the classic 6.0 system of judging was retired, and the ISU Judging System (IJS), or New Judging System(NJS), was put in place.  The 2006 Winter Olympics in Torino, Italy was the first Olympics to be judged using this protocol.  Overall, the ISU Judging System has resulted in major shifts in program design, and technical scoring, and perpetual searching to "game the system" with each iteration of rule updates. In 2009, the first team event was founded in Tokyo, Japan, (World Team Trophy).  After the 2009–10 season, the ice dancing competition was reduced from three segments to two by combining the compulsory and original dances into the short dance. The team event made its Olympic debut at the 2014 Winter Olympics in Sochi, Russia. Beginning in the 2014–15 season, all disciplines are allowed to use music with lyrics or words, previously restricted to ice dancing.

The competitive figure skating season runs from August until the date of the World Figure Skating Championships, typically held in March. Competitions may include various pre-novice levels, novice, junior, and senior events. Since the 1980s, four skating has disappeared while synchronized skating and solo ice dance have grown in popularity. The first World Synchronized Skating Championships were held in 2000. In September 2014, the International Skating Union sent the IOC a formal proposal for the inclusion of synchronized skating in the Winter Olympics.

References

 Benjamin T. Wright, Skating in America: the 75th Anniversary History of the United States Figure Skating Association. 535 p. Colorado Springs: United States Figure Skating Association.
 Michael Boo, The Story of Figure Skating. New York: Beech Tree, 1998. .

External links
 Skate Guard – figure skating history blog

Figure skating
Figure skating